Fontys University of Applied Sciences is a Dutch university of applied sciences, located in the southern Netherlands. It has over 44,000 students in several campuses  The three largest Fontys campuses are located in the cities of Eindhoven, Tilburg and Venlo. The name Fontys comes from the Latin word "fons" which means "source". Thus, Fontys wants to highlight that it is a source of knowledge for students. Fontys offers 200 bachelor's and master's study programmes in the fields of economics, technology, health care, social work, sports and teacher training. A selection of these programmes is offered in German and English. In the independent Dutch ranking known as Keuzegids, Fontys is among the top-ranked large universities of applied sciences in the Netherlands. In 2014, former Fontys Chairperson Nienke Meijer was declared as the "Most influential Woman of the Netherlands".

Ranking
On a regular basis, Fontys University of Applied Sciences is among the top-ranked universities of applied sciences in the Netherlands. Here, Fontys scores above-average results in the study fields of engineering, IT, logistics as well as business administration and management (consisting of the study programmes International Business (IB), Marketing Management (MM), and International Finance & Control (IFC).

The ranking is done annually by the Centre of Higher Education Information and published in the Keuzegids HBO. It takes into account the perspectives of experts, students and universities themselves. Next to factors such as student satisfaction with their university's lecturers and study content, student success rates, IT facilities and practice-orientation the ranking is based on the accreditation reports of the Dutch-Flemish Accreditation Organisation (NVAO).

All Fontys study programmes are accredited by the Dutch-Flemish Accreditation Organisation (NVAO) or equivalent British accreditation bodies.

About 11% (4,798) out of the 44,486 Fontys students come from abroad; they represent more than 70 countries around the world, with a large delegation from Germany. Many of these international students are enrolled as exchange students or degree students in English-taught bachelor and master programmes, often offered in cooperation with Fontys’ partner universities in other countries.

Campuses

Fontys campuses are equipped with computer rooms, libraries and student restaurants. Wireless internet is available throughout the campuses, enabling students to bring their laptop. In this way students can work, study, search for information whenever they want. The Student Facilities department at Fontys University of Applied Sciences offers advice and support about financial affairs, course-related matters, practical matters, sports facilities and student associations, supervises during the course of studies and provides information about events relating to the study process.

Eindhoven 

Fontys International Campus Eindhoven is located in the South-East of the Netherlands.

Tilburg 
Fontys has three locations in Tilburg.
 
Fontys International Campus Stappegoor is located on the southern outskirts of the city. The campus population consists of diverse students, ranging from Economics students to Software engineering students.

Fontys School of Fine and Performing Arts (Dutch: Fontys Hogeschool voor de Kunsten – FHK) groups all educational programs in the visual and performing arts under the same roof in a building known as the Kunstkluster ('Art cluster') located in the centre of the city.

The Fontys Academy of Journalism (Dutch: Fontys Hogeschool voor Journalistiek – FHJ) is located in the Professor Gimbrèrelaan, in the west of the city, and is one of the four journalism schools in the Netherlands.

Venlo 

Fontys Venlo is a young campus with an old history. At first, the Venlo University of Applied Sciences was established on the grounds of the former country estate De Wylderbeek (whose forest still contains protected artifacts from Roman times). In the late 1990s, the institution joined the growing Fontys network. Several renovations and expansions helped the campus buildings ("which were originally build by a congregation of nuns in 1965") remain "state of the art on the inside and outside". Today, the campus houses three institutes: Fontys Teacher Training Academy (FHKE), Fontys University of Applied Sciences for Technology and Logistics (FHTenL) and Fontys International Business School (FIBS).

Although Venlo's city centre was rebuilt after the Second World War, it has buildings dating back to the 14th century. The city retained the historical significance of its monuments and old facades. Ald Weishoes (Old Orphanage), Romerhoes (Romer House), the Stadhuis (City Hall) and the St. Martinuskerk (St. Martin's Church) are just some of the many historic buildings in Venlo's city centre. From 2013 to 2015, together with The Hague, Venlo was chosen to have the "best city centre in The Netherlands".

Both, the close location to the river Meuse (one of three major rivers in the Netherlands) and Germany make Venlo one of Europe's most important logistics hotspots. It is accessible via six surrounding airports: Eindhoven Airport, Maastricht Aachen Airport, Düsseldorf Airport, Weeze Airport, Cologne Bonn Airport and Dortmund Airport.

Study programmes

Fontys provides full-time study programmes. Several programmes are offered in English or German.

English and German Bachelor's programmes

Business and Management
 International Business (English)
 Accounting and Finance (English or Dutch)
 International Finance & Control (English or German)
 Marketing Management (English or German)
 International Fresh Business Management (English or German)
 International Communication Management (English)
 Marketing Management – Digital Business Concepts (English)
 Trend Research & Concept Creation in Lifestyle (English)

ICT and Engineering
 Applied Mathematics/Data Science (English)
 Automotive Engineering (English)
 Electrical and Electronic Engineering (English)
 Industrial Engineering & Management (English)
 Mechatronics Engineering (English or German)
 Mechanical Engineering (English or Dutch-German language mix)
 Information Technology (specializations: Software Engineering, Business Informatics) (English)
 Information & Communication Technology (specializations: ICT & Business, ICT & Media, ICT & Software Engineering, ICT & Technology, ICT & Media Design, ICT & Infrastructure) (English or Dutch)
 Industrial Design Engineering (English or Dutch-German language mix)

Logistics
 Logistics (specializations: Logistics Management, Logistics Engineering) (English or German)
 International Fresh Business Management (English or German)

Physiotherapy
 Physiotherapy (English)

Arts
 Circus and Performance Art (English)
 Dance Academy (English)

English Master's programmes 
 Master of Science in Business and Management (MBM) (in cooperation with University of Plymouth, UK)
 Master of Science in Finance (MFIN) (in cooperation with University of Plymouth, UK)
 Master of Business Administration (MBA) (in cooperation with FOM University of Applied Sciences for Economics and Management, Germany)
 Master of Science in International Logistics/ Procurement/ Operations and Supply Chain Management (in cooperation with University of Plymouth, UK)
 Master of Architecture
 Master of Urbanism
 Master of Music
 Master in Performing Public Space

Exchange programmes

Fontys has over 100 partner universities around the world, including Australia, Canada, China], Finland, Hong Kong], Italy, Mexico,Taiwan, the United Kingdom, the United States, Vietnam, and Zambia (to name only a few). In the third academic year, Fontys students are given the opportunity of studying abroad for one semester at one of the mentioned partner universities. Alternatively, students can choose to stay at Fontys and take part in one of many academic minors (secondary academic discipline) such as International Business Management, Trendwatching, Game Business or Event Management.

Accommodation

Through own student dormitories and contracts with landlords Fontys offers accommodation to its international students. All student apartments are furnished and located close to Fontys and/or the city centre.

Student company/software factory
Together with about 10 students from different study programmes, all business students at Fontys in Venlo start their own company which is officially registered in the Dutch Commercial Registry. For nearly a year the students manage their company including: writing a business plan, selling shares to finance your entrepreneurial activities, developing and selling a product/service, and filing a tax report. All positions and functions such as general manager, Marketing Manager or Finance Manager within the company are filled by students. At the end of the academic year the company is liquidated properly. Over the past years, several Fontys student companies participated in national and international business competitions and were awarded for their successful business. Engineering students at Fontys Venlo take part in the Software Factory where they develop customized software solutions for cooperating companies.

Internships/work placements
During their studies, all Fontys students do two internships (one semester in the third and fourth academic year). Internships can be done in the Netherlands or abroad. Students chose the company themselves but Fontys also provides a list of local and international partner companies. During both internships students work on a specific company project. They are supervised by one university lecturer and one company employee. Amongst others, these internships are useful for building a professional network and getting work experience which eases getting a job after studies.

Partner companies
Fontys has partnerships with more than 500 international companies including 3M, Adidas, Bayer, BMW, Coca-Cola, Daimler AG, Deloitte, Ernst & Young, Henkel, IKEA, KPMG, L'Oréal, Metro AG, Nike, Inc., Philips, Porsche, Robert Bosch GmbH, Siemens, Sony, Vodafone and Volkswagen. These companies either offer projects and/or internships to Fontys students.

Student organizations
Fontys has several student associations throughout its campuses:
DaVinci – First student association in Venlo founded in 1999
FC FSV-Venlo – Official Fontys Venlo football club playing at Seacon stadium of VVV-Venlo
Fontys4Fairtrade – Fontys Venlo sustainability committee working on projects to raise awareness for the environment and sustainability
Knowledge Business Consulting (KBC) – student-run business consultancy headquartered in Fontys Venlo providing consultancy services to companies in both Germany and the Netherlands
Omnia – Fontys Venlo student association organizing various events on campus (for business-related study programmes)
Proxy – Student association of ICT English stream in Fontys Eindhoven (study programme: Information and Communication Technology)
Student Sports Venlo – Organizing sports for students such as football, basketball, volleyball, tennis, rowing, fitness and urban dance

Notable alumni

 Elly Blanksma-van den Heuvel – Mayor of Helmond, Dutch politician and former banking manager at Rabobank
 Pieter Elbers – chief executive officer (CEO) and Chairman of the national flag carrier of the Netherlands KLM (Royal Dutch Airlines)
 Florence Kasumba – Ugandan-German actress
 Onno Hoes – Dutch politician and former Mayor of Maastricht
 Twan Huys – Dutch journalist, television presenter, and author
 Johannes Oerding – German singer-songwriter
 Hans Teeuwen – Dutch comedian, musician, actor and filmmaker
 Floor Jansen – Dutch singer, lead singer of Finnish symphonic metal band Nightwish
 Johan Roijakkers – Dutch international basketball coach

References

External links
Fontys University of Applied Sciences

Vocational universities in the Netherlands
1996 establishments in the Netherlands